William Tolmie may refer to:
 William Tolmie (politician), (1833–1875) New Zealand politician
 William Fraser Tolmie, Scottish-born Hudson's Bay Company agent